White Cloud Township is a township in Mills County, Iowa, USA.

History
White Cloud Township was organized in 1856.

References

Townships in Mills County, Iowa
Townships in Iowa